The Headies 2022 was the 15th edition of Nigerian music awards The Headies. It held at Cobb Energy Performing Arts Centre in Atlanta, Georgia, United States on 4 September 2022.

Wizkid lead nominations with ten, Tems and Ayra Starr with eight each. Davido and Adekunle received seven each. The Songwriter of the Year category included in the 2020 edition of The Headies, was renamed to Best Song Writer of the Year, in the 2022 edition.

Background 
Nominees  were announced on 24 May 2022, ahead of the main event which was held at Cobb Energy Performing Arts Centre in Atlanta, on 2 July 2022.

2022 edition has seven additional categories include; Best Afrobeat Pop Single (Nigeria), Best Afrobeat Pop Album (Nigeria), Best African Collaboration, Best International Collaboration, African Artist of the Year, International Artist of the Year, and Music Executive of the Year. On 25 June 2022, the executive held the first-ever Headies Brunch, titled "Unveiling The First Ever Global Awards For Afrobeats Music". with music from SPINALL, Major League DJz, Pius Gallery and Pheelz. The private brunch was held in Los Angeles.

Winners and nominees
Below list are nominees and winners. winners are listed first in bold.

References 

2022 awards
The Headies